Karoline Krüger (born 13 February 1970 in Bergen, Norway) is a Norwegian singer, actress and composer.

Career 
Krüger's first TV appearance was at the age of 11, in a youth show called Halvsju. She got her breakthrough in 1988, first by winning the Norwegian Melodi Grand Prix with the song "For vår jord" ("For Our Earth"), still a student at Langhaugen Skole (1986–89). This qualified her for the Eurovision Song Contest 1988 final, held that year in the Irish capital Dublin, where she finished fifth. Later that same year she released her debut CD, Fasetter. She sings the ballad You Call It Love, from the film L'etudiante, a song composed by Vladimir Cosma. The song was covered by Richard Sanderson.

In 2013 she did a series of Christmas concerts together with her husband Sigvart Dagsland, accompanied by the album Jul (2013).

Personal 
Krüger is married to another familiar Norwegian singer Sigvart Dagsland, and together they have two daughters, Sophie (b. 1998) and Emma (b. 2002).

Discography

Solo albums 
1988: Fasetter (Noahs Ark) (Peak NOR: #16)
1991: En gang i alles liv (Kirkelig Kulturverksted) (Peak NOR: #20)
1993: Fuglehjerte (Kirkelig Kulturverksted)
1996: Den andre historien (Kirkelig Kulturverksted) (Paek NOR: #36)
1999: Sirkeldans (Kirkelig Kulturverksted)
2004: De to stemmer (Kirkelig Kulturverksted)
2011: Veggen (Kirkelig Kulturverksted)
2013: Jul (Universal) Duet album with Sigvart Dagsland
2018: Labyrinter! (Grappa)

Singles

Collaborations

References

External links

1970 births
Living people
People educated at the Bergen Cathedral School
English-language singers from Norway
Eurovision Song Contest entrants of 1988
Melodi Grand Prix contestants
Melodi Grand Prix winners
Eurovision Song Contest entrants for Norway
Norwegian singer-songwriters
Musicians from Bergen
Norwegian people of German descent
People educated at Langhaugen Upper Secondary School
21st-century Norwegian singers
21st-century Norwegian women singers